USS Lewis and Clark  may refer to:

 , a Benjamin Franklin-class ballistic missile submarine of the U.S. Navy
 , a dry cargo ship of the U.S. Military Sealift Command

See also

United States Navy ship names